Ha-104 was an Imperial Japanese Navy Ha-101-class submarine. Completed and commissioned in December 1944, she served during the final months of World War II, making two supply voyages. She surrendered at the end of the war in September 1945 and was scuttled in October 1945.

Design and description

The Ha-101-class submarines were designed as small, cheap transport submarines to resupply isolated island garrisons. They displaced  surfaced and  submerged. They were designed to carry  of cargo.

For surface running, the boats were powered by a single  diesel engine that drove one propeller shaft. When submerged the propeller was driven by a  electric motor. They could reach  on the surface and  underwater. The boats were armed a single mount for a  Type 96 anti-aircraft gun.

Construction and commissioning

Ha-104 was laid down on 1 July 1944 by Kawasaki at Senshu, Japan, as Small Supply Submarine No. 4604. She was launched on 30 September 1944 and was named Ha-104 that day. She subsequently was towed to the Kawasaki shipyard at Kobe for fitting-out. She was completed and commissioned at Kobe on 1 December 1944.

Service history

Upon commissioning, Ha-104 was assigned to Submarine Squadron 11 for workups. She was reassigned to Submarine Squadron 7 in the 6th Fleet on 5 February 1945 and in mid-February 1945 departed Yokosuka, Japan, to take part in exercises.

Submarine Squadron 7 was disbanded on 20 March 1945, and Ha-101 was reassigned that day to Submarine Division 16 for supply operations. In late April 1945, she began preparations for a supply run to Marcus Island. On 8 May 1945, the Japanese garrison on Marcus Island transmitted a message warning that United States Army Air Forces B-24 Liberator bombers had recently attacked the island and that United States Navy submarines were patrolling in nearby waters. On 10 May 1945, Ha-104 departed Yokosuka bound for Marcus, arriving there on 13 May 1945. After unloading her cargo and bringing aboard mail and the cremated remains of 90 deceased Imperial Japanese Army soldiers for transportation to Japan, she got back underway the same day for the return voyage. Escorted along the way by submarine chasers and Imperial Japanese Navy Air Service aircraft, she returned to Yokosuka on 1 June 1945. After arriving at Yokosuka, she began a conversion to allow her to carry aviation gasoline.

On 26 June 1945, Ha-104 departed Yokosuka for her second supply run to Marcus Island. During July, she arrived at Marcus, discharged her cargo, and returned to Yokosuka.

Hostilities between Japan and the Allies ended on 15 August 1945, and on 2 September 1945, Ha-104 surrendered to the Allies at Yokosuka. The Japanese struck her from the Navy list on 15 September 1945. She was scuttled off Shimizu in October 1945.

Notes

References
 

 
 , History of Pacific War Extra, "Perfect guide, The submarines of the Imperial Japanese Forces", Gakken (Japan), March 2005, 
 Ships of the World special issue Vol.37, History of Japanese Submarines, (Japan), August 1993
 The Maru Special, Japanese Naval Vessels No.43 Japanese Submarines III, Ushio Shobō (Japan), September 1980, Book code 68343-43
 The Maru Special, Japanese Naval Vessels No.132 Japanese Submarines I "Revised edition", Ushio Shobō (Japan), February 1988, Book code 68344-36
 Senshi Sōsho Vol.88, Naval armaments and war preparation (2), "And after the outbreak of war", Asagumo Simbun (Japan), October 1975

Ha-101-class submarines
Ships built by Kawasaki Heavy Industries
1944 ships
World War II submarines of Japan
Maritime incidents in October 1945
Scuttled vessels
Shipwrecks in the Pacific Ocean
Shipwrecks of Japan